Arnold Plackett LRIBA (1887 – 3 June 1960) was an 20th century architect based in Long Eaton.

History

He was born in 1887 in Breaston, Derbyshire, the son of Augustus Plackett and Fanny Pepper.

He trained as an architect in the practice of Ernest Hooley, and then established himself in practice around 1910, initially in Central Chambers, Long Eaton, but shortly afterwards he moved to Imperial Buildings, Derby Road, Long Eaton.

He married Edith Mary Wilcox on 28 July 1914 in Long Eaton.

In 1916 he signed up to the North Staffordshire Regiment. In 1941 he joined the British Army and served in the Royal Army Pay Corps.

He retired in 1959 and closed his practice. He died in 1960 at his home 144, Wilsthorpe Road, Breaston, Derbyshire and left an estate valued at £15831 8s 10d.

His wife, Edith Mary Plackett, died in 1973.

Works
House, 149 Wollaton Road, Beeston. 1914 (now demolished)
House, 11 Devonshire Avenue, Beeston, 1923
House, 13 Devonshire Avenue, Beeston, 1925
Mayfair Ballroom, Oxford Street, Long Eaton
Four shops, 118–124 High Road, Beeston. 1928
House, 10 Marlborough Road, Beeston. 1929
Pair of houses, Holden Road, Beeston. 1934
28 Houses, Off Muriel Road, Beeston. 1935
Houses, Endsleigh Gardens, Beeston. 1935
Houses, Charnwood Avenue and Larch Crescent, Beeston. 1936
House, 12 Bramcote Avenue, Beeston. 1936
House, 1 Cumberland Avenue, Beeston. 1936
House, 63 Humber Road, Beeston. 1936
House, 191 Byepass Road, Beeston. 1937
Manor Farm Estate, High Road, Toton. 1939–40
Extensions to the works of W. Reynolds and Co, Watnall Road, Hucknall. 1948.

References

20th-century English architects
Architects from Derbyshire
1887 births
1960 deaths
People from Breaston
British Army personnel of World War II
Royal Army Pay Corps soldiers